Cheech & Chong are a comedy duo consisting of Cheech Marin and Tommy Chong. The duo found commercial and cultural success in the 1970s and 1980s with their stand-up routines, studio recordings, and feature films, which were based on the hippie and free love era, and especially drug and counterculture movements, most notably their love for cannabis.

Career

The duo met in Vancouver, British Columbia, in the late 1960s. Chong was a Canadian citizen, and Cheech had moved there from southern California to avoid the draft at the height of the Vietnam War. The pair performed stand-up shows, released many successful comedy record albums, and starred in a series of low-budget films. Some of their best-known comedy routines and songs include "Earache My Eye", "Basketball Jones", "Santa Claus and His Old Lady", and "Sister Mary Elephant". Perhaps their most famous line is "Dave's not here", from their self-titled debut album.

Their early success culminated with the release of their first feature-length movie, Up in Smoke, in 1978. It became something of a cult classic, and was also successful enough at the box office (grossing over $44 million despite a low budget) to warrant two sequels: Cheech and Chong's Next Movie in 1980, and  Nice Dreams in 1981. These were followed by the less successful Things Are Tough All Over (1982) and Still Smokin (1983). The pair attempted a departure from their stoner comedy with 1984's Cheech & Chong's The Corsican Brothers. To date, their most recent starring vehicle as a duo was 2014's Cheech & Chong's Animated Movie.

Tommy Chong directed four of their films while co-writing and starring in all seven with Cheech Marin.

They also appeared in smaller supporting roles in Graham Chapman's Yellowbeard and Martin Scorsese's After Hours.

In 1985 the duo released their album Get Out of My Room, which included the novelty hit song "Born in East L.A." (based on Bruce Springsteen's "Born in the U.S.A.").  This song later served as the basis for 1987 film of the same title, in which Cheech Marin played the starring role. Immediately following the release of the album, Cheech Marin separated himself from the pair's drug-inspired act by working on a solo career.

Reunion
After their contentious parting in the 1980s, the duo spent years without working together. In 1992 the two worked together for the first time in several years, voicing characters in the animated film FernGully: The Last Rainforest. In 1997, Chong made an appearance on Marin's TV series Nash Bridges, in an episode titled "Wild Card," which contained a reference to their iconic "Dave" skit from their 1972 debut album. In 2000 both performers voiced characters in the animated television series South Park for the episode "Cherokee Hair Tampons", but their voices were recorded separately. Both Marin and Chong indicated in a 2003 episode of Biography that they were willing to reunite.

The duo had plans to reunite for another film when Chong's California-based company, Chong's Glass, was raided by federal officials in February 2003, as part of a federal crackdown on "drug-related paraphernalia".  In a plea bargain which allowed his son and wife to remain out of jail, Chong pleaded guilty to charges of conspiring to distribute drug paraphernalia in May, and in September 2003 was sentenced to nine months in federal prison, fined $20,000, and forced to forfeit $120,000 in assets. He was released in July 2004. His cellmate was Jordan Belfort.

With Chong released, the duo planned to resume production on a reunion film. A variety of titles were rumored, including Grumpy Old Stoners. But they announced in September 2005 that the reunion film had been canceled.  Beginning in September 2008, Cheech and Chong reunited for the Light Up America comedy tour which opened in Ottawa, making a radio program appearance on The Bob & Tom Show. In March 2009, they recorded two shows at the Majestic Theatre in San Antonio for a DVD release of the reunion tour.

In 2011, both performers were guests stars on the animated sitcom The Simpsons, on the episode "A Midsummer's Nice Dream". The episode focuses on a fictitious separation of the duo, with Homer taking Chong's place.

In August 2012, Cheech & Chong appeared at the 13th annual Gathering of the Juggalos in Cave-in-Rock, IL.

In February 2014, Cheech and Chong appeared on an episode of Tom Green Live.

In March 2014, they announced they were working on a new movie, with writer/director Jay Chandrasekhar.

Additional notable media appearances

In 1974, Cheech & Chong contributed background voices on the song "Twisted", on Joni Mitchell's album Court and Spark.

In 1979, Cheech & Chong were given the Comedy Medal from Mira Costa College.

In 2007, Brett Harvey's marijuana advocacy documentary The Union: The Business Behind Getting High starred Tommy Chong as a commentator about marijuana related issues and his drug paraphernalia charge in 2003. The film had many other notable names such as former Vancouver mayor Larry Campbell, Canadian marijuana seed retailer Marc Emery, Canadian baking marijuana icon "Watermelon Girl", and other marijuana advocates like Author & Former 'Pot TV' Manager ChrBennett and former High Times editor Steve Bloom.

On November 5, 2008, Cheech and Chong reunited for a Funny or Die video titled "Cheech and Chong Get Out the Vote!" The video, which encouraged people to get out and vote, was released the day after the United States general election.

On November 30, 2008, Cheech & Chong were honored during the roast special Cheech & Chong: Roasted on TBS hosted by Brad Garrett which included other guests, among them Chong's wife. The event was filmed at Caesar's Palace in Las Vegas during The Comedy Festival.

On April 17, 2009, while on the Sydney leg of their "Cheech and Chong Light Up Australia" Tour, they had to delay the start of their show as it became the target of a drug operation by the New South Wales Police. About 25 police and four drug dogs were involved, searching around 50 people, with six people caught in possession of small amounts of cannabis.

On January 25, 2010, Cheech & Chong appeared on Lopez Tonight. During a singing segment they started to perform their song "Mexican Americans", but it turned into "Get It Legal", in reference to their current U.S. tour. On March 1, 2010, Cheech & Chong were the guest hosts of WWE Raw in Oklahoma City. On April 20, 2010 (4/20) Cheech and Chong's Hey, Watch This, the DVD filmed in San Antonio on March 14, 2009, was released.

In September 2011, Cheech & Chong appeared in a viral video posted on YouTube which at first appeared to be a trailer for a (non-existent) upcoming movie titled Cheech & Chong's Magic Brownie Adventure, but which at the end revealed itself to be a commercial for Fiber One 100-calorie snack brownies.

In 2012, Chong revealed to CNN's Don Lemon that he was battling prostate cancer. It was unknown how this would affect any future projects.

On September 28, 2014, they were guests of Doug Benson on his podcast Getting Doug with High.

The pair appeared together on The Late Show with Stephen Colbert on April 23, 2018, in response to recent news that John Boehner had joined the board of a marijuana company. The pair expressed displeasure that marijuana was no longer rebellious, Cheech remarking that he could now buy weed "from a store in a strip mall" when before he could only buy it from "behind a store in a strip mall". They then joked that they would no longer be doing stoner comedy and would do comedy about things that were still illegal, such as unpasteurized dairy products, importing exotic reptiles, taping and distributing football games without the consent of the NFL, and burning leaves without a permit.

Cheech & Chong were selected by the Red Hot Chili Peppers to present to them the Global Icon Award at the 2022 MTV Video Music Awards on August 28, 2022.

Discography

 Cheech and Chong (1971)
Big Bambu (1972)
Los Cochinos (1973)
Cheech & Chong's Wedding Album (1974)
Sleeping Beauty (1976)
Let's Make a New Dope Deal (1980)
Get Out of My Room (1985)

Filmography

Primary films

 Up in Smoke (1978)
 Cheech and Chong's Next Movie (1980)
 Nice Dreams (1981)
 Things Are Tough All Over (1982)
 Still Smokin (1983)
 Cheech & Chong's The Corsican Brothers (1984)
 Get Out of My Room (1985)
 Hey, Watch This! (concert film) (2010)
 Cheech & Chong's Animated Movie! (2013)

Secondary films

 Cheech & Chong Perform / Cheech & Chong Perform Again?! (concert films, 1978) 
 A pre-Up in Smoke live performance, split over two separate VHS releases.
 It Came from Hollywood (compilation, 1982)
 Yellowbeard (1983)
 Born in East L.A. (1987)
 A spin-off from Get Out of My Room.  Often considered a Cheech & Chong film (and has been packaged on DVD as part of the series both in America and overseas), though Tommy Chong does not appear in the film (other than as a depiction of Jesus). 
 Far Out Man (1990) 
 a/k/a Tommy Chong (documentary, 2006)
 Cheech & Chong: Roasted (2008)

Notable side projects

 After Hours (1985) 
 Both Cheech and Chong appear.
Rude Awakening (1989)
Cheech only
 The Shrimp on the Barbie (1990) 
 Cheech only, though marketed in Germany as a Cheech & Chong-related film under the title Cheech ohne Chong - Jetzt rauchts in Neuseeland (loosely translated as 'Cheech without Chong - Smoking in New Zealand').
 FernGully: The Last Rainforest (1992) 
 Both Cheech and Chong provide character voices.
 The Cisco Kid (1994) 
 Cheech only, though marketed in Germany as a Cheech & Chong-related film under the title Cheech ohne Chong - Jetzt rauchts in Wilden Westen (loosely translated as 'Cheech without Chong - Smoking in The Wild West').
 A Million to Juan (1994) 
 Only a small role by Cheech, though still included in the "Cheech & Chong's Smoke Box" DVD set.
 McHale's Navy (1997) 
 Two small roles by Tommy Chong, though still included in the "Cheech & Chong's Smoke Box" DVD set.
 Evil Bong (2006) 
 Tommy Chong only, though still included in the "Cheech & Chong's Smoke Box" DVD set, among others.
 Hoodwinked Too! Hood vs. Evil (2011) 
 Both Cheech and Chong provide character voices.
 Paradoria (2015)
 Both Cheech and Chong provide character voices of Vinnie & Winnie.

Unproduced films

In 1980, there were plans to make a film called Riding High with Cheech & Chong.

Ivan Reitman conceived Stripes as a Cheech and Chong vehicle. Cheech and Chong's manager thought the script was very funny; however, the comedy duo wanted complete creative control, so Reitman told the screenwriters to rewrite it for Bill Murray and Harold Ramis.

Screenwriter Tom McLoughlin also pitched a sequel to the slasher film Friday the 13th in which Cheech and Chong, playing camp counselors, faced off against killer Jason Voorhees, as a comedy horror movie in the vein of Abbott and Costello Meet Frankenstein.

The hyenas Banzai and Shenzi in the 1994 animated film The Lion King were storyboarded as being characters modeled after Cheech and Chong. Due to the duo not getting along with each other at the time, and Whoopi Goldberg taking interest in the role of Shenzi, Chong was not cast, but Cheech played the part of Banzai.

Mobile applications
Cheech and Chong's The Fatty (2011)
Cheech and Chong's Bud Farm (2020)

References

External links
 
 Official Live Nation Tour website
 
 
 HoboTrashcan's One on One with Tommy Chong An in-depth interview about politics, Cheech and Chong and Tommy's wife and kids
 L.A. Weekly photographs of Cheech and Chong's "Light Up America" reunion show at the Roxy Theater, September 18, 2008

 Submerge magazine interview with Cheech Marin and Tommy Chong, Jan. 2009
 First to confirm "Up in Smoke 2" Chronicles of The Nerds Interview with Cheech Marin and Tommy Chong, Feb. 2010
 review, Cheech & Chong's Hey Watch This by UnRated magazine

American cannabis activists
American comedy duos
American novelty song performers
American satirists
Cannabis culture
Epic Records artists
Film duos
Grammy Award winners